Nogent is a commune in the Haute-Marne department, northeastern France.

It is known since the 18th century for the manufacture of knives; the local Musée de la Coutellerie is dedicated to the history of knife making in Nogent.

Population

See also
Communes of the Haute-Marne department

References

Communes of Haute-Marne